Outer Harbour or Harbor may refer to:

 Great Yarmouth Outer Harbour
 Outer Harbor, South Australia
 Outer Harbor railway line
 Outer Harbor railway station
 Outer Harbour Ferry Terminal
 Outer Harbour of Fremantle Harbour
 Toronto Outer Harbour